Kirovs Lipmans (born 5 November 1940) is a Latvian business person and former ice hockey executive. He served as president of the Latvian Ice Hockey Federation from 1994 to 1995, and from 1998 to 2016; was a member of the Latvian Olympic Committee executive, and sat on International Ice Hockey Federation (IIHF) committees. He oversaw the increase of artificial ice hockey rinks in Latvia from three to seventeen, and the Latvia men's national team qualify for the top tier of the World Championships then play in four consecutive Olympic hockey tournaments. Lipmans oversaw the construction of Arena Riga for the hosting the 2006 IIHF World Championship, and Latvia was awarded co-hosting duties for the 2021 IIHF World Championship at the end of his presidency.

Lipmans in a native of Liepāja, graduated from the Leningrad Institute of Railway and Transport Engineering and the University of Latvia, and has worked as an economist. He oversaw the construction of a production facility and laboratories, and transitioned Grindeks into a global company that exported 90 per cent of its products. He was made an Officer of the Order of the Three Stars for contributions to Latvia, and received the Paul Loicq Award from the IIHF for contributions to international ice hockey.

Early life and education
Kirovs Lipmans was born on 5 November 1940 in Liepāja, Latvia. He graduated from the Leningrad Polytechnic Institute in 1961, and the Leningrad Institute of Railway and Transport Engineering in 1975. He later worked for Valsts elektrotehniskā fabrika (VEF; State Electrotechnical Factory) as an economist, and as head of its computer base center. During the Singing Revolution, he was chairman of the co-operative VEF-Radio. He later graduated from the University of Latvia with an engineer economist degree.

Business career

Lipmans was president of Liepājas Metalurgs from 1996 to 2003, a metallurgy facility in Liepāja. He served as a deputy on the Liepāja City Council from 2000 to 2004, as a candidate of the Christian Democratic Union. He has been the chairman of the council of Grindeks since 2003, and also served as chairman of the councils of JSC Kalceks and JSC Tallinn pharmaceutical facilities, and as chairman of the board of Liplat Holdings Limited. As of 2015, he was co-chairman of the Latvia-Belarus Economic Co-operation Council.

Profits grew annually and by 2010, Latvian newspaper Ir reported him to be the second-richest person in the country. He transitioned Grindeks from having the majority of its sales in Commonwealth of Independent States countries, into a company with 90 per cent of its products exported and a presence in European, Asian and American markets. In May 2021, the Riga Regional Court fined them  for selling state-owned Grindeks shares in 2017, which Lipmans felt was politically motivated litigation.

Ice hockey career
Lipmans served as president of the Latvian Ice Hockey Federation (LHF) from 1994 to 1995, and from 1998 to 2016; and was also a member of the Latvian Olympic Committee executive. He was appointed an advisor to International Ice Hockey Federation (IIHF) president René Fasel; and sat on the IIHF committees for strategy development, discipline and statutes. As the LHF president, he oversaw the Latvia men's national team improve from the third tier of the World Championships in 1993, to qualification for the top tier in 1997. The national team remained at the top tier during his tenure as president, and participated in four consecutive Olympic hockey tournaments from 2002 to 2014. Lipmans was also involved in operating professional hockey teams in Latvia, and served as president of HK Liepājas Metalurgs from 1996 to 2003. He was later a founding member of Dinamo Riga, and resigned from its council in 2008 to avoid a conflict of interest as the LHF president.

When Lipmans began as LHF president, Latvia had only three artificial ice hockey rinks of which two met IIHF standards. As of 2015, this number had grown to 17 artificial ice rinks. The LHF was awarded hosting duties for the 2006 IIHF World Championship, and Lipmans oversaw the construction of Arena Riga for the event. The 11,000-seat arena was a requirement for hosting the World Championship, and was delayed due to disagreements on the construction contract and finding an investor to fund the project. The Baltic Times reported that Lipmans was to blame for the delays, and that he was asked to resign due to a conflict of interest with owning shares in the arena's management company. The LHF also hosted lower division tournaments of the IIHF World Women's Championship in 2000, 2003, 2004, 2008, 2012 and 2014. At the end of his presidency, the LHF was awarded co-hosting duties with Belarus for the 2021 IIHF World Championship. Lipmans was succeeded by Aigars Kalvītis as the LHF president in October 2016.

Honors and awards
Lipmans was recognized for his contributions to Latvia when made an Officer of the Order of the Three Stars in 2001, and was given the Sportsperson of the Year Award from the Latvian Sports Federation in 2006. He received the "Valetudo Patriae" (Health for the Motherland Award) from the Latvian Medical Association in 2017, in recognition of contributions to the development of medicines and health care. He received the Paul Loicq Award from the IIHF in 2018, in recognition of contributions to international ice hockey.

Personal life
Lipmans is married to Anna Lipmans (born 1948), a neurologist and member of the Latvian Medical Association. They have a family home in Jūrmala, and have donated money to sports and children; and sponsored concerts including Inese Galante's opera Summertime, and the Jurmala Young Pop Singer Competition operated by Laima Vaikule.

Lipmans's ancestry in Latvia dates to the 17th century. In a 2020 interview, he stated that his mother always said, "You live in Latvia, and you have to leave something good for this country". When his cousins in the United States and Canada asked him to leave Latvia during the political changes in the 1990s, Lipmans expressed a desire to stay and stated, "No, I will stay in Latvia, because this is my country, and I will do my best to make this a good and rich country". He stated that his personal motto in life has been, "If I promise something, I will do it"!

References

1940 births
Living people
20th-century Latvian businesspeople
21st-century Latvian businesspeople
21st-century Latvian politicians
Businesspeople in the pharmaceutical industry
Latvian ice hockey people
Latvian sports executives and administrators
Paul Loicq Award recipients
Peter the Great St. Petersburg Polytechnic University alumni
Politicians from Liepāja
Sportspeople from Liepāja
University of Latvia alumni